Howard Snyder (May 24, 1909 - April 13, 1963) was an American screenwriter. He wrote for Jack Benny's radio and television program The Jack Benny Program from 1936 to the early 1960s, often in partnership with Hugh Wedlock Jr., and also wrote for 20th Century Fox, Warner Bros., Universal and Paramount. Snyder died in April 1963 in a traffic accident in Los Angeles, California, at the age of 53.

References

External links 

1909 births
1963 deaths
People from New York (state)
Screenwriters from New York (state)
American male television writers
American radio writers
American television writers
American male screenwriters
20th-century American screenwriters
American comedy writers
Road incident deaths in California